The 1938 Kerry Senior Football Championship was the 38th staging of the Kerry Senior Football Championship since its establishment by the Kerry County Board in 1889.

Boherbee John Mitchels entered the championship as the defending champions, however, they were beaten by North Kerry in the semi-finals.

The final was played on 27 November 1938 at Austin Stack Park in Tralee, between Dingle and North Kerry, in what was their first ever meeting in the final. Dingle won the match by 3–03 to 2–05 to claim their first ever championship title.

Results

Semi-finals

Final

Championship statistics

Miscellaneous
 Dingle win the title for the first time.
 North Kerry qualify or the final for the first time since 1932.

References

Kerry Senior Football Championship
1938 in Gaelic football